Masudur Rahman Baidya (1968 – 26 April 2015) was an Indian swimmer who was the world's first physically disabled swimmer to swim across the Strait of Gibraltar.

Biography
Masudur Rehman Baidya was born in 1968 at Ballabhpur, North 24 Parganas in West Bengal in a Bengali poor family. His father was an imam of a local mosque. At the age of ten, young Masudur lost both his legs in a train mishap. In the year, 1989, at a swimming event organized by the Artificial Limb Centre at Pune, Masudur came first in sixteen out of seventeen competitions. 
In spite of his physical disabilities, he came fifth on two other events after this. On the first occasion, he swam from Panihati to Ahiritola in the heart of the Ganges river, flowing through Kolkata; and came fifth. He also stood fifth in an eighty-one kilometers long swimming competition organized in the district of Murshidabad in West Bengal. 
In 1997, he became the first physically disabled Asian swimmer to successfully cross the English channel. Followed by this, in the year 2001, he became the world's first physically disabled swimmer to swim across the Strait of Gibraltar. He achieved this feat; by swimming from the Tarifa islands in Spain to shores of Morocco- a total distance of twenty two kilometers- in just about four hours and twenty minutes.

Death
In his later life, Masudur was diagnosed with anemia and owing to his limbs becoming increasingly impaired; he died on 26 April 2015 at a hospital in Kolkata, aged 46.

References

1968 births
2015 deaths
Indian male swimmers
People from North 24 Parganas district
Indian people with disabilities
Sportsmen with disabilities
Sportspeople with limb difference
Male long-distance swimmers
Swimmers from West Bengal
20th-century Indian people
21st-century Indian people